Søvesten (The Southwest) is a local Norwegian newspaper published in Kyrksæterøra in Trøndelag county. The newspaper was launched in 1994. It appears once a week, on Thursdays. It is edited by May S. Bjørkaas.

Circulation
According to the Norwegian Audit Bureau of Circulations and National Association of Local Newspapers, Søvesten has had the following annual circulation:
2004: 1,591
2005: 1,572
2006: 1,600
2007: 1,563
2008: 1,595
2009: 1,490
2010: 1,502
2011: 1,492
2012: 1,408
2013: 1,349
2014: 1,317
2015: 1,293
2016: 1,244

References

External links
Søvesten homepage

Newspapers published in Norway
Norwegian-language newspapers
Heim, Norway
Mass media in Trøndelag
Publications established in 1994
1994 establishments in Norway